Dongri jail is a British era jail on Jail road, Dongri, an area in Mumbai, India. It played an important role in the Indian freedom movement, as it played host to a number of under-trial freedom fighters like Bal Gangadhar Tilak, Savarkar and Agarkar.

The jail was built by the British in the eighteenth century as on 1804. Originally located within the Dongri fort ramparts, building of a separate jail was first suggested by Aungler in 1671. The people initially detained here included both, Indians as well as British nationals. For instance, in March 1701, the Provost Marshal John Hall was confined to the Dongri jail for being drunk. As time progressed, especially towards the end of the nineteenth and beginning of twentieth centuries, its inmates mostly consisted of Indians, especially those charged with sedition (usually freedom fighters) or people awaiting trial.

It now functions as a juvenile delinquents home for children who are below 18 years of age, convicted of crimes.

List of famous inmates 
 Bal Gangadhar Tilak (1882)
 Gopal Ganesh Agarkar (1882)
 Veer Vinayak Damodar Savarkar (1911)

References 

Prisons in Maharashtra
Government buildings in Mumbai